The 1913 State of the Union Address was given by Woodrow Wilson, the 28th president of the United States, on Tuesday, December 2, 1913.  It was given directly to the 63rd United States Congress by the president as a speech. Wilson was the first to deliver it as a speech, rather than a written message, since John Adams in 1800. With a few exceptions all addresses since then have been given directly following Wilson's lead.

It was his first.  He stated, "The country, I am thankful to say, is at peace with all the world, and many happy manifestations multiply about us of a growing cordiality and sense of community of interest among the nations, foreshadowing an age of settled peace and good will." The speech was just over 3,500 words and took 28 minutes to read.

In 2014 RealClearPolitics placed it 10th on their list of "Top 10 State of the Union Addresses" for its break with tradition.

References

State of the Union addresses
Presidency of Woodrow Wilson
Speeches by Woodrow Wilson
63rd United States Congress
State of the Union Address
State of the Union Address
State of the Union Address
State of the Union Address
December 1913 events